Shooting has been included in the Summer Paralympic Games from the 1976 Games. Australia has been represented at each Games since 1976.

Notable Australian athletes:
 Elizabeth Kosmala, a wheelchair athlete, has won 12 shooting medals (9 gold and 3 silver medals). Kosmala has been selected in the team for London Games. It will be her 11th consecutive Games.
 Barbara Caspers has won 7 medals (5 gold, 1 silver and  1 bronze medals)

Medal table

Summer Paralympic Games

1976

Australia represented by:
Men – Kevin Bawden, J. Handbridge 
Women – Elizabeth Richards  
Australia won 1 gold medal through Elizabeth Richard's performance in Mixed rifle shooting 2–5.

1980

Australia represented by: 
Men – Peter Pascoe 
Women – Barbara Caspers,  Elizabeth Kosmala  
Australia won 6 medals - 2 gold medals, 3 silver medals and 1 bronze medal

1984

Australia represented by: 
Men – Troy Andrews, Kevin Bawden, Keith Bremner, Allan Chadwick, Peter Parker, Andrew Rainbow, Stanley Sims, Grant Walker 
Women – Barbara Caspers, Elizabeth Kosmala  
Australian team won 9 gold medals - Barbara Caspers and Elizabeth Kosmala both won 4 gold medals and Allan Chadwick one gold medal.

1988 Seoul

Australia represented by: 
Men – Robert Bakker,  Keith Bremner, Allan Chadwick,  Andrew Rainbow,  Stanley Simms,  Grant Walker  
Women – Barbara Caspers,  Elizabeth Kosmala 
Elizabeth Kosmala won all Australia's shooting medals - 3 gold medals and one silver medal.

1992 Barcelona

Australia represented by: 
Men – Keith Bremner, Andrew Rambow 
Women – Elizabeth Kosmala

1996 Atlanta

Australia represented by: 
Men – Ashley Adams, Keith Bremner, Iain Fischer, James Nomarhas, Peter Worsley 
Women – Patricia Fischer, Libby Kosmala  
Coach – Yvonne Hill (Head), Raymund Brummell

2000 Sydney

Australia represented in shooting by:
Men – Ashley Adams, Stephen Guy,  Stan Kosmala, Jeff Lane, James Nomarhas, Paul Schofield, Peter Shannon, Peter Tait, Peter Worsley 
Women – Elizabeth Kosmala 
Coaches – Yvonne Hill (Head), Anne Bugden, Evangelos Anagnostou 
Officials – Andre Jurich 

Australia won a silver medal with Peter Tait's performance in the pistol.  Six shooters made finals.

2004 Athens

Australia represented in shooting: 
Men -  Ashley Adams, James Nomarhas, Peter Worsley, David Ziebarth Women – Elizabeth Kosmala 
Coaches - Miroslav Sipek (Head), Hans Heiderman 
Officials - Michelle Fletcher (Manager), Craig Jarvis, Elizabeth Ziebarth  
Australia won 1 silver and 1 bronze medal through Ashley Adams' performances.

Detailed Australian Results

2008 Beijing

Representing Australia in shooting: 
Men - Ashley Adams, Sebastian Hume, Jason Maroney  
Women - Libby Kosmala 
Coaches - Miro Sipek (Head Coach),  Michelle Fletcher 
Officials - Nick Sullivan (Section Manager), Anne Bugden  

Australia did not win a medal.

Detailed Australian Results

2012 London

Representing Australia in shooting:

Men - Ashley Adams, Luke Cain, Jason Maroney, Bradley Mark 
Women - Libby Kosmala, Natalie Smith  
Coach - Miro Sipek  Officials – Section Manager – Nick Sullivan, Technical Support – Stuart Smith, Personal Care Attendant – Anne Bugden, Yvonne Cain, Margaret Zubcic   
Libby Kosmala competed at her 11th Paralympic Games at the age of 70. Ashley Adams competed at his 4th Games. Natalie Smith won a bronze medal.

Detailed Australian Results

 2016 Rio
Representing Australia in shooting:Men - Luke Cain, Bradley Mark, Chris Pitt (d), Anton Zappelli (d)Women - Libby Kosmala, Natalie Smith 
'Coach - Head Coach - Miro Sipek, Assistant Coach - Margret Bugden,  Officials - Team Leader - Tim Mahon,  Carers - Yvonne Cain, Stuart Smith, Maragret Zubcic 
 
Australia did not win any medals. Australia's best placing was Christopher Pitt's fourth.

Detailed Australian Results

 2020 Tokyo

Representing Australia in shooting:Men - Chris Pitt, Anton ZappelliWomen - Natalie Smith Officials''' - Team Leader - Kurt Olsen, Technical Support - Catherine Berry   
Australia did not win any medals. 

Detailed Australian Results

(d) Paralympic Games debut Australia did not win any medals. Australia's best placing was Christopher Pitt's fourth.

See also
 List of Australian Paralympic shooting medalists
 Shooting at the Summer Paralympics
Australia at the Paralympics

References

Australian Paralympic teams
Australian
Shooting sports in Australia